Florian "Flo" Lechner (born 3 March 1981) is German former professional footballer who played as a defender.

Career

Bundesliga career
Lechner was born in Ellwangen. He began his career in the youth ranks of VfB Stuttgart. In 2001, he debuted for VfB Stuttgart II and was a regular starter for the club's reserve side for three seasons.

In 2004, Lechner joined FC St. Pauli. Lechner made his professional debut in the 2. Bundesliga with St. Pauli on 8 February 2009 when he came on as a substitute in the 42nd minute against Greuther Fürth. On 11 May 2011, FC St. Pauli announced that Lechner's expiring contract would not be renewed. While with St. Pauli he appeared in 117 league games and scored two goals. In 2011, he joined Karlsruher SC and made 12 league appearances for the club.

New England Revolution
For the 2012 season, Lechner signed for New England Revolution in Major League Soccer.  He made his debut for the Revolution on 31 March 2012 in a league match against the Los Angeles Galaxy coming on as a substitute in the 46th minute for Kevin Alston. The Revolution went on to win 3–1.

Lechner was released by New England on 19 November 2012.

References

External links
 

1981 births
Living people
People from Ellwangen
Sportspeople from Stuttgart (region)
German footballers
Footballers from Baden-Württemberg
Association football defenders
Bundesliga players
2. Bundesliga players
Major League Soccer players
FC St. Pauli players
VfB Stuttgart II players
Karlsruher SC players
New England Revolution players
German expatriate footballers
German expatriate sportspeople in the United States
Expatriate soccer players in the United States